Joseph D. Sargent is the former president, chief executive officer and chairman of the board of The Guardian Life Insurance Company of America. Sargent joined Guardian in 1959, immediately following his graduation from Fairfield University. He spent his entire career with Guardian, previously having held the offices of senior vice president of health insurance, senior vice president of individual life insurance and executive vice president.

Sargent continues to serve on the board of directors at Guardian.  He also serves as treasurer and a member of the board of directors for United Way of New York City.  He is a trustee of the Discovery Museum Foundation of Bridgeport, Connecticut and is a member of the advisory council of the Charles F. Dolan School of Business at Fairfield University.

He is a recipient of the Ellis Island Medal of Honor as authorized by the U.S. Congress, and the Alumni Professional Achievement Award from Fairfield University.

External links
Fairfield University Alumni Achievement Award Profile

References

Fairfield University Dolan School of Business alumni
American chief executives of financial services companies
Living people
Year of birth missing (living people)